Preljubište is a village in the municipality of Jegunovce, North Macedonia.

History
According to the 1467-68 Ottoman defter, Preljubište appears as being largely inhabited by an Orthodox Christian Albanian population. Due to Slavicisation, some families had a mixed Slav-Albanian anthroponomy - usually a Slavic first name and an Albanian last name or last names with Albanian patronyms and Slavic suffixes. 

The names are: Stepan, son of Gjon; Vitan, son of Marin; Dimitri, son of Gjon; Kosta, son of Gjurgj; Gjurgji, son of Kosta; Stajk, son of Maltush; (Mal-Tush); Mili, son of Petro; Nikolla, son of Petro.

Demographics
According to the 2002 census, the village had a total of 367 inhabitants. Ethnic groups in the village include:

Macedonians 270
Albanians 92
Romani 4
Serbs 1

References

External links

Villages in Jegunovce Municipality
Albanian communities in North Macedonia